Oleg Yeremeyev (born June 11, 1979) is a Kazakhstani former professional ice hockey left winger.

Yeremeyev played in the Russian Superleague for Traktor Chelyabinsk, HC Lada Togliatti, Krylya Sovetov Moscow, CSK VVS Samara, SKA Saint Petersburg and Salavat Yulaev Ufa between 1997 and 2001. He also played for the Kazakhstan men's national ice hockey team in the 2002 World Championship Division 1.

References

External links

1979 births
Living people
Arlan Kokshetau players
Barys Nur-Sultan players
Beibarys Atyrau players
HC CSK VVS Samara players
HC CSKA Moscow players
Gazprom-OGU Orenburg players
Kazakhstani ice hockey left wingers
Kazzinc-Torpedo players
Krylya Sovetov Moscow players
HC Lada Togliatti players
Molot-Prikamye Perm players
SKA Saint Petersburg players
Saryarka Karagandy players
Sportspeople from Oskemen
Traktor Chelyabinsk players
Yertis Pavlodar players
Asian Games silver medalists for Kazakhstan
Medalists at the 2007 Asian Winter Games
Ice hockey players at the 2007 Asian Winter Games
Asian Games medalists in ice hockey